The 1995 Atlantic Coast Conference men's basketball tournament took place in Greensboro, North Carolina, at the Greensboro Coliseum. Wake Forest won the tournament, defeating North Carolina, 82–80, in the championship game. Randolph Childress of Wake Forest was named tournament MVP, scoring 107 points in three games, a tournament record that still stands as of 2020.

Bracket

AP rankings at time of tournament

Games

Finals

Randolph Childress penetrated from the lane, drove right and hit a 10-footer with 4.6 seconds left. North Carolina had one more chance as Pierce Landry inbounded to Jerry Stackhouse, who launched a three-pointer that bounced off the rim and Landry failed to tip in. Childress, who scored a game-high 37 points, broke the ACC Tournament scoring record of Lennie Rosenbluth (1957) and was named Tournament MVP. It was Wake Forest's first conference title since 1962.

Awards and honors

Everett Case Award

All Tournament Teams

First Team

Second Team

References

External links
 

Tournament
ACC men's basketball tournament
College sports tournaments in North Carolina
Basketball competitions in Greensboro, North Carolina
ACC men's basketball tournament
ACC men's basketball tournament